Universiti Sains Islam Malaysia (abbreviated as USIM) is an Islamic university in Nilai, Seremban, Negeri Sembilan, which is fully owned and funded by the Malaysian government. Being the 12th Public Institution of Higher Learning (Malay: Institusi Pengajian Tinggi Awam; IPTA), it aims to spearhead knowledge and be the global reference centre for Islamic science.

History

KUIM was made a public university on 13 March 1998. The university started operation in January 2000 at the National University of Malaysia in Bangi. The first enrolment for KUIM began on 18 June 2000 in a temporary location at Institut Professional Baitulmal, Kuala Lumpur. In January 2002, KUIM moved again to another temporary campus in Tower A and B, Persiaran MPAJ, Pandan Indah at Kuala Lumpur. On 15 July 2005, KUIM moved to its permanent campus at Nilai, while the medical faculty remained at Kuala Lumpur. KUIM was officially upgraded to university status on 1 February 2007.

Aims
The objectives of USIM are to uphold Islamic studies, bring Islamic studies into the national main education stream, and emphasise the use of information technology in education and research systems. Focus is also put in mastering Arabic and English language as well as the national language.

Motto
"Berilmu, Berdisiplin Dan Bertakwa" (Knowledgeable, Disciplined and Devout)

Education sectors

Faculties
 Faculty of Quranic and Sunnah Studies (FPQS)
 Faculty of Science & Technology (FST)
 Faculty of Medicine and Health Sciences (FPSK)
 Faculty of Dentistry (FPg)
 Faculty of Syariah and Law (FSU)
 Faculty of Economics and Muamalat (FEM)
 Faculty of Leadership and Management (FKP)
 Faculty of Major Language Studies (FPBU)
 Faculty of Engineering and Environmental Design (FKAB)

Centres of Excellence (CoE)
 International Fatwa and Halal Centre (IFFAH)
- The World Fatwa Management and Research Institute (INFAD)
- Halal Research and Management Institute (IHRAM)

Academic centres
 Division of Academic Management
 Centre for Graduate Studies
 Tamhidi Centre
 Genius Insan
 Centre of Core Studies
 Centre of Soft Skills Development
 Centre of Student Entrepreneurship Development

Graduate programme
CGS offers programmes in the form of research and thesis writing and coursework in full-time and part-time basis.

Faculty of Economics and Muamalat
 Master of Islamic Finance
 Master of Accounting and Syariah Audit
 Master of Islamic Banking
 Master of Muamalat Administration 
 Master of Muamalat Administration (Halal Product)
 Master of Economics and Muamalat Administration
 Doctor of Philosophy in Economics and Muamalat Administration

Faculty of Leadership and Management
 Master of Da’wah and Islamic Leadership
 Master of Counseling (Family Counseling)
 Master of Counseling (Substance Abuse)
 Master of Communication (Media Management)
 Master of Da’wah and Islamic Management
 Doctor of Philosophy in Da’wah and Islamic Management
 Doctor of Philosophy (Counselling)
 Doctor of Philosophy (Communication)
 Doctor of Philosophy (Human Resource Management)

Faculty of Major Language Studies
 Master of Arabic Communication
 Master of Arabic Language (Islamic Literature)
 Master of Arabic Language (Translation)
 Doctor of Philosophy (Education)
 Doctor of Philosophy (English Study)
 Doctor of Philosophy (Arabic Study)

Faculty of Quranic and Sunnah Studies
 Master of Quranic and Sunnah Studies
 Doctor of Philosophy in Quranic and Sunnah Studies

Faculty of Science and Technology
 Master of Science
 Doctor of Philosophy in Science and Technology

Faculty of Syariah and Law
 Master of Syariah
 Master of Comparative Law
 Master of Laws
 Doctor of Philosophy in Syariah and Judiciary

Undergraduate programme
USIM offers 25 undergraduate programmes through 8 faculties:

Faculty of Leadership and Management (FKP)
 Bachelor of Da'wah and Islamic Management with Honours (QI07)
 Bachelor of Counseling with Honours (QA19)
 Bachelor of Communication with Honours (QA02)
 Bachelor of New Media Communication with Honours (QP57)
 Bachelor of Akidah and Religion Studies with Honours (QI13)

Faculty of Quranic and Sunnah Studies (FPQS)
 Bachelor of Quranic and Sunnah Studies with Honours (QI05)
 Bachelor of Quranic Studies with Multimedia with Honours (QI10)
 Bachelor of Sunnah Studies with Information Management with Honours (QI11)

Faculty of Syariah and Law (FSU)
 Bachelor of Syariah and Law with Honours (QL04)
 Bachelor of Fiqh and Fatwa with Honours (QI08)

Faculty of Economics and Muamalat (FEM)
 Bachelor of Muamalat Administrations with Honours (QP21)
 Bachelor of Accounting with Honours (QE02)
 Bachelor of Marketing (Financial Services) with Honours (QE06)
 Bachelor of Corporate Administration with Relations with Honours (QP49)
 Bachelor of Islamic Banking and Finance with Honours

Faculty of Science and Technology (FST)
 Bachelor of Science with Honours (Food Biotechnology) (QG07)
 Bachelor of Science with Honours (Actuarial Science and Risk Management) (QS10)
 Bachelor of Computer Science with Honours (Information Security and Assurance) (QC13)
 Bachelor of Science with Honours (Financial Mathematics) (QS43)
 Bachelor of Science with Honours (Applied Physics) (QG00)
 Bachelor of Science with Honours (Industrial Chemistry Technology) (QS21)

Faculty of Engineering and Environmental Design (FKAB)
 Bachelor of Science in Architecture with Honours (QH00)
 Bachelor of Engineering with Honours (Electronic Engineering) (QK86)

Faculty of Medicine and Health Sciences (FPSK)
 Bachelor of Medicine and Surgery (MBBS) (QM00)

Faculty of Major Languages Studies (FPBU)
 Bachelor of Arabic and Communication with Honours (QB05)
Bachelor of Arabic Language and Islamic Literature with Honours
 Bachelor of Education (Islamic Education) with Honours (QT35)
Bachelor of English Language with Commerce (Honours)

Faculty of Dentistry (FPg)
 Bachelor of Dental Surgery (QD00)

Tamhidi (matriculation) programme
USIM offers five Tamhidi programmes that are closely related to the bachelor's degree programmes, namely:
  Tamhidi of Medicine
  Tamhidi of Science and Technology
  Tamhidi of Syariah and Law
  Tamhidi of Accounting and Muamalat
  Tamhidi of Dentistry

Research scope
  Arabic Education
  Teaching Arabic as a Second Language (TASL)
  Language and Arabic Literature
  English Education
  English as a Second Language (ESL) and Education
  English for Specific Purposes
  ESL, Language and Literature
  Education, Politics, Editing and Writing
  Comparative Law
  Syariah and Law
  Syariah and Judiciary
  Fiqh and Usul Fiqh
  Tarikh Tashri’ and Usul Fiqh
  Constitutional Law
  Commercial Law and E-Commerce
  Syariah
  Quranic Exegesis (Tafsir)
  Ulum Al-Quran
  Ulum Hadith
  Contemporary Quranic Studies
  Islamic Studies
  Islamic Management
  Islamic Thought
  Islamic History
  Dakwah and Philosophy
  Dakwah and Leadership
  Tasawwuf
  Sufism and Theology
  Theology
  Theology and Philosophy
  Aqidah, Islamic Philosophy and Logic
  Counseling Psychology
  Negotiation and Human Communication
  Mass Communication
  Corporate Communication
  Information Technology
  Information Management
  Economic Growth and Development
  Social Economics
  Insurance
  Finance (Investments and International Finance)
  Applied Econometrics (Modeling Commodity Markets)
  K-Economy and Applied Economics
  Business and Management
  Islamic Insurance (Takaful)
  Marketing
  Food Science
  Labour and Industrial Economics
  Genetics of Plant Disease
  Genetics (Breeding and Biotechnology)
  Breeding for Disease Resistance
  Plant Biotechnology

Gallery

References

 https://www.usim.edu.my
 https://alamiyyah.usim.edu.my
 http://stracomm.usim.edu.my/
 http://fpqs.usim.edu.my/
 http://fpsk.usim.edu.my/
 http://fpg.usim.edu.my/
 http://fst.usim.edu.my/
 http://fsu.usim.edu.my/
 http://fem.usim.edu.my/
 http://fkp.usim.edu.my/
 http://fpbu.usim.edu.my/
 http://tamhidi.usim.edu.my/
 http://cgs.usim.edu.my
 https://goal-itqan.usim.edu.my
 http://ihram.usim.edu.my/
 http://acreda.usim.edu.my/
 http://geniusinsan.usim.edu.my/

External links

 University Sains Islam Malaysia
 https://web.archive.org/web/20111012124116/http://www.usimonline.my/
 http://goals.usim.edu.my/moodle/index.php
 http://egallery.usim.edu.my/
 http://ddms.usim.edu.my/
 http://radio.usim.edu.my/
 http://alumni.usim.edu.my/index.php

Seremban District
 
1998 establishments in Malaysia
Educational institutions established in 1998
Islamic universities and colleges in Malaysia
Law schools in Malaysia
Universities and colleges in Negeri Sembilan